Two ships of the United States Navy have borne the name Boise, after   Boise, Idaho.

 , was a light cruiser commissioned in 1938. The ship was later sold to Argentina.
 , is a Los Angeles-class nuclear attack submarine.

References

United States Navy ship names